Mayogo (also spelled Mayugo, Majugu, Maigo, Maiko, Mayko and also called Kiyogo) is a Ubangian language spoken by the Day (Angai), Maambi, and Mangbele peoples of the Democratic Republic of the Congo. It is not close enough to Bangba, the most closely related language, for mutual intelligibility.

Writing system

References

Languages of the Central African Republic
Languages of the Democratic Republic of the Congo
Ngbaka languages